Diego Drumm (born 18 December 1968) is a German boxer. He competed in the men's featherweight event at the 1988 Summer Olympics. At the 1988 Summer Olympics, he lost to Kirkor Kirkorov of Bulgaria.

References

External links
 

1968 births
Living people
German male boxers
Olympic boxers of East Germany
Boxers at the 1988 Summer Olympics
Sportspeople from Leipzig
Featherweight boxers